Nicolas Puech (born 1943) is a French billionaire heir and businessman, a fifth-generation descendant of Thierry Hermès. He resigned from the company's supervisory board in 2014, but still owns 5% of Hermès.

Nicolas Puech was born in 1943 in Neuilly-sur-Seine, the son of Francis Puech and  Yvonne Hermès. He is the brother of Bertrand Puech and the cousin of Jean-Louis Dumas.

Puech lives in Martigny, Switzerland.

References

1943 births
Living people
French billionaires
French businesspeople
French expatriates in Switzerland
Hermès-Dumas family